Buffalo Island Central School District (or BIC) is a public school district based in Monette, Arkansas, United States. The Buffalo Island Central School District provides early childhood, elementary and secondary education for more than 850 prekindergarten through grade 12 students at its four northeast Arkansas facilities at Monette in Craighead County and Leachville in Mississippi County.

Buffalo Island Central School District's two schools are accredited by the Arkansas Department of Education (ADE) and AdvancED.

History
It was established on July 1, 1984, by the merger of the Leachville School District and the Monette School District.

Schools 
 Buffalo Island Central High School—serving more than 150 students in grades 10 through 12 in Monette, Craighead County.
 Buffalo Island Central Junior High School—serving more than 180 students in grades 7 through 9 in Leachville, Mississippi County.
 Buffalo Island Central West Elementary School—serving approximately 250 students in pre-kindergarten through grade 6 in Monette, Craighead County.
 Buffalo Island Central East Elementary School—serving approximately 275 students in pre-kindergarten through grade 6 in Leachville, Mississippi County.

References

Further reading
 (Download) - Includes maps of predecessor districts

External links 
 

School districts in Arkansas
Education in Craighead County, Arkansas
Education in Mississippi County, Arkansas
1984 establishments in Arkansas
School districts established in 1984